Deora may refer to:

 Deora (custom car), a customized 1965 Dodge A100 pickup truck
 Deora, Colorado, an unincorporated community in Baca County, Colorado, United States
 Milind Murli Deora (b. 1975), Indian politician
 Mukul Deora, Indian film producer
 Murli Deora (1937–2014), Indian politician
 Diora or Deora, 8th-century Bishop of Rochester
 Deora, a census town in West Bengal, India